The Central Reserve Bank of El Salvador (Spanish: Banco Central de El Salvador) is the central bank of El Salvador, which controls the currency rate and regulates certain economic activities within El Salvador. The bank was originally privately owned, but was brought under state control through The Law of the Reorganization of Central Banking.

The bank is active in developing financial inclusion policy and is a member of the Alliance for Financial Inclusion. In 2013, the bank made a joint Maya Declaration Commitment with the Superintendencia del Sistema Financiero of El Salvador to carry out a series of concrete and measurable actions.

Presidents
Luis Alfaro Durán, 1934-1954
Carlos J. Canessa, 1954-1961
Manuel López Harrison, 1961
Francisco Aquino, 1961-1966
Guillermo Hidalgo Qüehl, 1966-1967
Abelardo Torres, 1967
Alfonso Moisés Beatriz, 1967-1971
Edgardo Suárez Contreras, 1971-1975
Guillermo Hidalgo Qüehl, 1975-1977
Víctor Hugo Hurtarte, 1978-1979
Pedro Abelardo Delgado, 1980-1981
Alberto Benítez Bonilla, 1981-1987
Maurice Choussy Rusconi, 1987-1988
Mauricio Antonio Gallardo, 1988-1989
Roberto Orellana Milla, 1989-1998
Gino Rolando Bettaglio, 1998-1999
Rafael Barraza, 1999-2002
Luz María de Portillo, 2002-2009
Carlos Gerardo Acevedo, 2009-2013
Marta Evelyn de Rivera, 2013-2014
Oscar Cabrera Melgar, 2014-2019
Carlos Federico Paredes, 2019
Nicolás Alfredo Martínez, 2019-

See also
 Economy of El Salvador

References

External links
  Official site of Banco Central de Reserva de El Salvador

El Salvador
Banks of El Salvador
Central Reserve Bank
Banks established in 1934
1934 establishments in El Salvador